Courts in Delhi:
The National Capital Territory (NCT) of Delhi has one Supreme Court, one High Court, 7 District-level Courts and various other Tribunals.

Supreme Court
The Supreme Court of India is the highest court of the Republic of India located between Tilak Marg and Delhi-Mathura road (NH-2) in New Delhi.

High Court
The High Court of Delhi, established in 1966, is the highest court of the NCT of Delhi. It is located on Shershah road near India Gate in New Delhi.

District Courts
 District Courts of Delhi: There are 7 district-level courts for the 11 Administrative Districts of Delhi.

 

Note: The above are 7 physical locations of the district courts, whereas actually there are 11 district courts headed by individual District Judges.

Tribunals
Apart from these above courts, there are various Tribunals in Delhi:

 Appellate Tribunal for Electricity
 Central Administrative Tribunal
 Competition Appellate Tribunal
 Customs, Excise and Service Tax Appellate Tribunal
 Cyber Appellate Tribunal
 Income Tax Appellate Tribunal
 Railway Claims Tribunal
 Debt Recovery Tribunal
9.National Company Law Tribunal

10.National Green Tribunal

References

Judiciary of India
Law enforcement in Delhi